Oneida mejona is a species of snout moth in the genus Oneida. It is found in Guatemala and Mexico.

References

Moths described in 1922
Epipaschiinae